Moarves de Ojeda is a town belonging to the municipality of Olmos de Ojeda in the province of Palencia (Castile & León, Spain).

Basic Details 
The population of Moarves of Ojeda is 31 according to the Spanish Statistics National Institute (INE) in 2012.

Coordinates 
Altitude: 939 metres.
Latitude: 42° 42′ N
Longitude: 004° 24′ O

Etymology 
The toponym Moarves comes from the word mozarabs (the name of the town in the Middle Ages was Moharabes) referring to the first settlers of the town that were the Mozarabs.

History 
The town belonged to the Merindad menor de Monzon (a type of former county subdivision dating from the 12th century). When the Former Regime disappeared, the town became an independent municipality. In the 1842 census, there were 18 households and 63 neighbours. Finally, the town merged into the larger municipality of Olmos de Ojeda.

Artistic heritage 
The most important monument in Moarves de Ojeda is the Church of St John the Baptist, also known as St John of Moarves. It is a superb Romanesque style church.

There is another church: the Church of St Peter that keeps some beautiful Romanesque corbels.

Gallery of images

Sources 

 Celdrán, Pancracio: Diccionario de topónimos españoles y sus gentilicios. Espasa Calpe, 2002. .
 García Guinea, Miguel Ángel: Románico en Palencia. Diputación de Palencia, 2002 (2ª edición revisada). .

See also 

 Province of Palencia
 Castile and León
 Romanesque art

References

External links 
 Province of Palencia Tourism Website 

Populated places in the Province of Palencia